Delamere Air Weapons Range is a bombing range operated by the Royal Australian Air Force (RAAF), located in the Northern Territory of Australia.

The Delamere facility is managed round-the-clock by a detachment of eight members of the No. 322 Expeditionary Combat Support Squadron RAAF. In addition to its large mass inert weapon range, Delamere also has two practice ranges for smaller weapons testing, a simulated airfield complex, and a simulated township constructed from shipping containers named "Tac Town".

Both areas are used for joint military exercises such as the Australia–United States Exercise Talisman Saber. Delamere is electronically linked with Bradshaw Field and  Mount Bundey Training Area to form the North Australian Range Complex.

The range is served by its own airfield, Delamere Range Facility Airport .

See also

List of Royal Australian Air Force installations
List of airports in the Northern Territory

References

Military installations in the Northern Territory
Bombing ranges
1988 establishments in Australia
Airports in the Northern Territory
Katherine, Northern Territory
Royal Australian Air Force bases
Military installations established in 1988